Stetsenko is a Ukrainian surname. Outside of Ukraine, it is also prevalent in Russia and found in the United States.

Notable people with this surname include:

 Anna Stetsenko, Soviet-American psychologist
 Anna Stetsenko (swimmer) (born 1992), Ukrainian Paralympian 
 Kyrylo Stetsenko (1882–1922), Ukrainian composer
 Oleksandr Stetsenko (born 1990), Ukrainian footballer
 Paul Stetsenko (born 1962), Ukrainian-American musician
 Tatyana Stetsenko (born 1957), Soviet rower
 Yuri Stetsenko (born 1945), Ukrainian canoeist

References

See also
 

Ukrainian-language surnames